Salt Creek Township is one of the eleven townships of Hocking County, Ohio, United States. As of the 2010 census the population was 1,210.

Geography
Located in the southwestern corner of the county, it borders the following townships:
Perry Township - north
Laurel Township - northeast corner
Benton Township - east
Jackson Township, Vinton County - southeast
Eagle Township, Vinton County - south
Harrison Township, Ross County - southwest
Colerain Township, Ross County - west
Salt Creek Township, Pickaway County - northwest corner

It is the most southerly township in Hocking County.

No municipalities are located in Salt Creek Township.

Name and history
Salt Creek Township was named from the creek and associated salt production there.

It is one of five Salt Creek Townships statewide.

Government
The township is governed by a three-member board of trustees, who are elected in November of odd-numbered years to a four-year term beginning on the following January 1. Two are elected in the year after the presidential election and one is elected in the year before it. There is also an elected township fiscal officer, who serves a four-year term beginning on April 1 of the year after the election, which is held in November of the year before the presidential election. Vacancies in the fiscal officership or on the board of trustees are filled by the remaining trustees.

References

External links
County website

Townships in Hocking County, Ohio
Townships in Ohio